City of Baker School System is a school district headquartered in Baker, Louisiana, United States.

The school district serves the City of Baker.

Schools
All schools are located in the City of Baker.

Secondary schools
 Baker High School 
 Baker Middle School

Elementary schools
 Baker Heights Elementary School
 Bakerfield Elementary School
 Park Ridge Elementary School

References

External links
 City of Baker School System

School districts in Louisiana
Education in East Baton Rouge Parish, Louisiana